Casey Walker (November 13, 1912 – June 15, 1998) was an American Negro league catcher in the 1930s.

Walker played for the Indianapolis Athletics in 1937. In his 12 recorded games, he posted 12 hits and seven RBI in 36 plate appearances. Walker died in Chicago, Illinois in 1998 at age 85.

References

External links
 and Seamheads

1912 births
1998 deaths
Place of birth missing
Indianapolis Athletics players
20th-century African-American sportspeople